One Main Place is a mixed-use skyscraper hotel and office building at 1201 Main Street in Dallas, Texas. The building rises . It contains 33 above-ground floors, and was completed in 1968. One Main Place currently stands as the 27th-tallest building in the city. The architectural firm that designed the building was Skidmore, Owings & Merrill, which also designed the Willis Tower and John Hancock Center in Chicago and the Burj Khalifa in Dubai. Gordon Bunshaft was the lead designer of One Main Place, and a few of his notable buildings include Lever House in New York, the Beinecke Rare Book and Manuscript Library at Yale University, and the Hirshhorn Museum and Sculpture Garden in Washington, DC. The building was listed on the National Register of Historic Places in 2015.

Originally conceived in the 1950s by the Dallas Texas Corporation to become Dallas's first Superblock, the building's 30,000-sq-ft footprint occupies only a third of the 2.4-acre property, almost a full city block. To the east and west of the property, recessed plazas provided tenants with access to the exterior without the intrusion of automobiles. The 1.1 million-sq-ft building includes five subsurface levels tied to the Dallas Pedestrian Network and a 700-space parking garage. Excavation work on the project began in 1965 and construction was completed in 1968. Following completion, One Main was immediately sold to Equitable Life Insurance Company. Subsequent owners included RREEF and RAK Group. Today, New Orleans-based KFK Group owns the building known as "One Main".

In 2015, a large portion of the building was converted to a hotel, the Westin Dallas Downtown. Opened in December 2015, the hotel has an entrance on the ground floor, while the second floor of the building houses the hotel's public rooms, with the lobby in the former banking hall, as well as a restaurant and a bar. The third floor houses convention facilities. The top 10 floors of the building have been converted to hotel rooms, leaving 10 floors of offices. The 32nd floor houses a pool and the Westin Workout Studio overlooking Main Street.

In popular culture
Lobby and exteriors of the building were used in location filming and for establishing shots in seasons two and three of the original night-time drama Dallas. In the show, the building housed the offices of Cliff Barnes during his tenure as head of the fictional Office of Land Management.

See also

National Register of Historic Places listings in Dallas County, Texas
List of Dallas Landmarks
List of tallest buildings and structures in Dallas

References

External links

The Westin Dallas Downtown official website
One Main Place on Emporis
One Main Place on SkyscraperPage

Skyscraper office buildings in Dallas
Office buildings completed in 1968
Commercial buildings on the National Register of Historic Places in Texas
National Register of Historic Places in Dallas
Skyscraper hotels in Dallas
Skidmore, Owings & Merrill buildings